Don Orlich is professor emeritus of the Science Mathematics Engineering Education Center at Washington State University. He has published more than 100 professional papers, co-authored more than 30 monographs and books, and is the senior co-author of “Teaching Strategies: A guide to Effective Teaching,” published by Houghton Mifflin in 2004.

He has conducted an independent study of Washington's WASL standards based assessment, concluding, “The WASL is a disaster” Orlich has concluded that the fifth grade science WASL exceeds the intellectual level of the majority of fifth graders, the seventh grade math WASL is more like a ninth grade test. Learning goals for the seventh grade is almost identical to many 10th grade goals.

He has authored a soon to be released book titled “School Reform and the Great American Brain Robbery,”. He analyzed areas of the WASL using criteria from developmental psychology and the Scales of the National Assessment of Education Progress (NAEP). Orlich has found areas of the Grade Level Expectations (GLEs), hence the WASL test, to be developmentally inappropriate. He has won a national award from the Association for Supervision and Curriculum Development for a critical analysis he wrote on the fourth-grade WASL, although the OSPI disagrees with the analysis.

Notes

External links
  Orlich on the WASL

Education reform
Year of birth missing (living people)
Living people
Washington State University faculty
Place of birth missing (living people)